Albert Vikentyevich Starchevsky (born Adalbert-Voytekh Starchevsky, 28 April 1818, Kiev Governorate, Imperial Russia, — 7 October 1901, Saint Petersburg, Imperial Russia) was a  Russian literary historian, journalist, editor, philologist, lexicographer  and encyclopedist of Polish descent.

Born in the Ivki village, Kiev Governorate, into a Polish family, Starchevsky studied law first at Kiev University, then at Saint Petersburg University. He published his first major work (Foreign Writers' Accounts of Russia, 1841, followed by the part two of it, Historiae Rathenicae Scriptores exteri saeculi XVI, 1842) while still a student.

An authority on East European and Asian languages, he authored numerous books on Slavic philology and ethnography, compiled and edited several important Eastern languages dictionaries, including the Ancient Slavic Language dictionary (1899), as well as the original edition of the Russian Encyclopedic Dictionary, in 1848–1853. Starchevsky edited Biblioteka Dlya Chtenya (with Osip Senkovsky, in the 1850s), Syn Otechestva (from 1856, for some twenty years, with breaks), then (in 1879–1885) Sovremennost (Our Times), Ulei (Beehive), Ekho (Echo) and Rodina (Native Land) newspapers.

References 

Russian journalists
Russian editors
Russian literary historians
People from Kiev Governorate
People from the Russian Empire of Polish descent
1818 births
1901 deaths